The Nazareth College Golden Flyers men's volleyball team is the NCAA Division III volleyball team of Nazareth College. The Golden Flyers won the Molten Division III Men's Invitational Volleyball Championship Tournament in 2011. The Golden Flyers lost in the finals of the NCAA Men's Division III Volleyball Championship in 2013 and both matches were
against Springfield College.

All-Americans

In 5 of the last 6 seasons under Wickens, there has been at least one First Team All-American named from his team. Naz has had 10 First Team selections, 11 Second Team selections, 1 Player of the Year and 1 Newcomer of the Year. Coach Wickens is a two time Coach of the Year (2011 & 2013) and his assistant Kyle Salisbury was the 2011 Assistant Coach of the Year.

References

External links
 

 
College men's volleyball teams in the United States